Testosterone hexahydrobenzoate (THHB), or testosterone cyclohexanecarboxylate (TCHC), sold under the brand names Testormon Depot, Sterandryl Retard, Tardosterandryl, and Testosteron-Depot among others, is an androgen and anabolic steroid medication and a testosterone ester. It is used by intramuscular injection and is provided in the form of ampoules containing 100 mg THHB in oil solution. THHB has comparable pharmacokinetics to those of testosterone cypionate and testosterone enanthate. The medication is no longer marketed. It was previously available in Great Britain.

See also
 Nandrolone cyclohexanecarboxylate

References

Abandoned drugs
Androgens and anabolic steroids
Androstanes
Testosterone esters